Robert Hugh Fearon Anderson (19 May 1931 – 14 August 1967) was a British Grand Prix motorcycle road racer and racing driver. He competed in Grand Prix motorcycle racing from 1958 to 1960 and in Formula One from 1963 to the 1967 seasons. He was also a two-time winner of the North West 200 race in Northern Ireland. Anderson was one of the last independent privateer drivers in Formula One before escalating costs made it impossible to compete without sponsorship.

Racing career

Motorcycle racing
Anderson was born in Hendon in the north of London and later lived in Haynes, Bedfordshire. He trained as an agricultural engineer though, left after a year and got a job as a mechanic in a local machinery dealer. He began his motorcycle racing career in 1953 competing on a 500cc Triumph Special at Cadwell Park. By 1955 he was racing a Matchless G45 at circuits such as Crystal Palace and Castle Combe and placed 8th at the 1955 Senior Manx Grand Prix. Switching to a Norton in 1956, he finished second to Jimmy Buchan at the Senior Manx Grand Prix and won the 500cc North West 200.

Anderson established himself as one of the top national competitors in 1957 with victories at Cadwell Park, Crystal Palace, Snetterton, Brands Hatch and won the 350cc North West 200. He finished second to world champion John Surtees at the 1958 Senior TT race at the Isle of Man, then considered the most prestigious motorcycle race on the world championship circuit. Anderson began to compete in the Grand Prix world championships in 1958, scoring another second place result behind Geoff Duke at the 350cc Swedish Grand Prix.

Switch to auto racing
At the end of 1960, Anderson sustained a back injury while racing in South Africa which, led him to switch to auto racing at the relatively late age of 29. In 1961 he drove a Lola in a Formula Junior race at Snetterton. He continued to race cars and eventually competed as a Team Lotus driver in the Formula Junior championship, winning a race at Autodrome de Montlhéry and finishing second at Monaco.

He entered Formula One in 1963 with his own Lola Mk4 car, under the guise of DW Racing Enterprises, a small team compared to other private outfits such as Scuderia Filipinetti or Rob Walker Racing Team. DW was actually only composed of Anderson and a small team of mechanics. Despite this hindrance he took the flexible little Lola to victory in the non-Championship Rome Grand Prix in that first year. In later years he ran private Brabham cars under the same banner, with his best result a third place in the 1964 Austrian Grand Prix. He was awarded the Von Trips Memorial Trophy as the most successful private entrant of 1964.

In 1967 he suffered an accident while testing at Silverstone, in which he slid off the track in wet conditions and hit a marshal's post. Anderson suffered serious chest and neck injuries and died later in Northampton General Hospital.

Racing record

Motorcycle Grand Prix results

(key) (Races in bold indicate pole position; races in italics indicate fastest lap)

Complete Formula One World Championship results
(key)

Non-Championship Formula One results
(key) (Races in bold indicate pole position)
(Races in italics indicate fastest lap)

References

1931 births
1967 deaths
Sportspeople from Bedfordshire
People from Hendon
People from Chipping Barnet
English racing drivers
English Formula One drivers
DW Racing Enterprises Formula One drivers
English motorcycle racers
125cc World Championship riders
350cc World Championship riders
500cc World Championship riders
Isle of Man TT riders
Racing drivers who died while racing
Sport deaths in England